Lost Mysteries or Scooby-Doo Lost Mysteries is a series of artworks by artist Travis Falligant. The series functions as both a parody of Scooby-Doo and horror films. The early artworks simply portray the Scooby Gang coming across classic horror film characters (mostly slasher killers) drawn as to look like screenshots from the original Scooby-Doo, Where Are You! show, later images sometimes feature The New Scooby-Doo Movies style title screens with guest star like appearances from horror film personalities. A few pieces do not feature horror themes but instead controversial or provocative figures of entertainment, such as persons associated with exploitation films.

History

Pieces

Reception

Book

See also 
 List of Scooby-Doo, Where Are You! episodes
 List of The New Scooby-Doo Movies episodes
 Lists of horror film characters

References

External links
 Lost Mysteries on IBTrav.com

Parodies of Scooby-Doo
Parodies of horror